Elmhurst is a primarily residential neighborhood in the northwest quadrant of Providence, Rhode Island.  Douglas Avenue and Admiral Street bound Elmhurst to the northeast, Academy Avenue and Smith Street bound it to the west, while Chalkstone Avenue marks the southern border.

History
In the eighteenth and nineteenth centuries, Elmhurst was mostly large tracts of land used for farming. Streets constructed along present-day Douglas Ave, Eaton Street, and Chalkstone Avenue allowed for transit of produce to the city. The neighborhood remained sparsely settled for most of the nineteenth century.  A streetcar line connecting Elmhurst to the city was opened in 1882. In 1909, the city acquired a piece of land on either side of a stream flowing from Academy Avenue, parallel to Chalkstone, and created Pleasant Valley Parkway, a landscaped boulevard similar in design to Blackstone Boulevard in the Blackstone neighborhood of Providence, though the residents attracted to the area were not as wealthy as their Blackstone counterparts.

In the early 1900s, Irish and Italian immigrants making their way out of crowded closer neighborhoods displaced the initial middle and upperclass residents. Institutional growth came over the next few decades in the form of the founding of the Charles V. Chapin Hospital, the Providence Lying-In Hospital (now Women and Infants Hospital) – the first Women's Maternity Services facility in the region, and the Homeopathic Hospital of Rhode Island (now Roger Williams Medical Center). Providence College and La Salle Academy moved to the area in 1917 and 1925 respectively.

Nathanael Greene Middle School, a yellow brick Tudor Gothic style public school, was built in 1929 on Chalkstone Avenue.

Following World War II, Elmhurst saw growth of a suburban character as it was one of the few areas in Providence with undeveloped land. Most of these houses were built in the northwestern part of the neighborhood.

Demographics
As of 1990 census, Elmhurst was the least ethnically diverse neighborhood in Providence, with less than 3% nonwhite. The median family income was 40% higher than the median for the city and unemployment, at 4.6%, was half that of the city as a whole.

According to the Providence Plan, a local nonprofit aimed at improving city life, 82% of residents are white, 9% Hispanic, and 5% African-American. 28% of children under the age of six speak a language other than English as their primary language.

The median family income is $51,503, above the citywide average of $32,058. 6.4% of families live below the poverty line while 2% of families receive some form of public assistance.

References

External links
Neighborhood Profiles at providenceri.com

Irish-American culture in Rhode Island
Italian-American culture in Providence, Rhode Island
Neighborhoods in Providence, Rhode Island